Qatar competed in the 1994 Asian Games in Hiroshima, Japan. They won a total of (4) gold, (1) silver, and (5) bronze medals. They won a total of 10 medals. They won all their medals in athletics, in the men's 100m, 200m, 400m, 1500m, 5000m, 400m hurdles, 1x400m relay, and 4 × 400 m relay.

References

Nations at the 1994 Asian Games
1994 in Qatari sport
Qatar at the Asian Games